Don Schlundt (March 15, 1933 — October 10, 1985) was an American college basketball player. He was born in St. Joseph County, Indiana, to Martin and Anna (née Bodtke) Schlundt. He died in Indianapolis.

Collegiate career

Schlundt, a 6'9 center, played collegiately at Indiana University after a standout high school career at Washington Clay High School in South Bend, Indiana.  He played for the Hoosiers from 1951-1955.  Freshmen were eligible to play college basketball in 1952 due to the Korean War, making Schlundt one of the hundreds of 1950's-era players to compete for four varsity seasons.  Schlundt led the Hoosiers to the 1953 National Championship.

Schlundt was named an All-American in 1953, 1954 and 1955.  He left IU as the school's all-time leading scorer with 2,192 points - a mark that stood for 32 years until Steve Alford broke it.  Following the completion of his collegiate career, Schlundt opted to pursue a career in business rather than professional basketball.

He was elected to the Indiana University athletics Hall of Fame in 1982 and is also a member of the Indiana Basketball Hall of Fame.  Schlundt died of cancer on October 10, 1985.

See also
List of NCAA Division I men's basketball career free throw scoring leaders

References

External links
Indiana Basketball Hall of Fame page
Indiana University Athletics Hall of Fame page

1932 births
1985 deaths
All-American college men's basketball players
Basketball players from South Bend, Indiana
Centers (basketball)
Indiana Hoosiers men's basketball players
Syracuse Nationals draft picks
American men's basketball players